Nerissus tuberculatus is a species of leaf beetle from Cameroon and the Democratic Republic of the Congo. It was first described by Martin Jacoby in 1901.

Subspecies
There are two subspecies of N. tuberculatus:

 Nerissus tuberculatus tuberculatus Jacoby, 1901: The nominotypical subspecies. Found in Cameroon.
 Nerissus tuberculatus uelensis Burgeon, 1941: Found in the Democratic Republic of the Congo.

References 

Eumolpinae
Insects of Cameroon
Beetles of the Democratic Republic of the Congo
Taxa named by Martin Jacoby
Beetles described in 1901